Gunther Cunningham (June 19, 1946 – May 11, 2019) was an American football head coach. He served as the Kansas City Chiefs head coach for two seasons. He also had two stints as the Chiefs' Defensive Coordinator. He served as an assistant coach for five other National Football League (NFL) teams and four college teams. He coached football for 47 consecutive seasons without taking any years off.

Early life
Cunningham was born in 1946 in war-torn Munich, Germany to an American serviceman and a German mother before moving to the United States at age ten. He attended the University of Oregon, where he played linebacker and placekicker before embarking on a coaching career that spanned almost fifty years.

Coaching career
In 1995, Cunningham was hired by the Chiefs as the defensive coordinator after spending the previous four seasons as a coach with the Los Angeles Raiders.

During his original tenure as defensive coordinator, Cunningham's defenses allowed an average of only 16.4 points per game, the best mark in the NFL and had a turnover margin of +30, tops in the AFC. Under his lead, a number of players excelled, including stars such as Neil Smith, James Hasty, Dale Carter, and Pro Football Hall of Fame linebacker Derrick Thomas. Cunningham's defenses led Kansas City to an overall record of 42-22.

After the Chiefs missed the playoffs in 1998, head coach Marty Schottenheimer resigned, opening the door for Cunningham's promotion to the head coach position. In his first season, the Chiefs finished 9-7, but were eliminated from playoff contention on the final day of the season when the Oakland Raiders's Joe Nedney kicked a field goal as time expired.  After the Chiefs regressed to 7-9 a year later, Cunningham was fired and replaced by Dick Vermeil. The move was controversial at the time as Cunningham claimed he was never informed by management that he was to be fired and only found out about it after discovering the article regarding his termination on the Chiefs website after he showed up to work one morning. Cunningham went on to become a successful linebackers coach for the Tennessee Titans. Cunningham was hired again in 2004 to revitalize a defense that had finished near or at the bottom of the overall rankings since Schottenheimer and Cunningham departed.

For the 2008 season, Cunningham coached the Chiefs' linebackers as well as serving as the defensive coordinator.

Cunningham was hired as the Detroit Lions defensive coordinator on January 21, 2009, about a week after the Lions hired new head coach Jim Schwartz, who he worked with on the Titans from 2001–2003.

Personal life
He became a naturalized U.S. citizen on April 6, 2010. Cunningham and his wife had two children. Cunningham died on Saturday, May 11, 2019 from cancer.

Head coaching record

References

1946 births
2019 deaths
Arkansas Razorbacks football coaches
Baltimore Colts coaches
California Golden Bears football coaches
Detroit Lions coaches
Hamilton Tiger-Cats coaches
Indianapolis Colts coaches
Kansas City Chiefs coaches
Kansas City Chiefs head coaches
Los Angeles Raiders coaches
National Football League defensive coordinators
Oregon Ducks football players
Oregon Ducks football coaches
San Diego Chargers coaches
Stanford Cardinal football coaches
Tennessee Titans coaches
Sportspeople from Munich
German emigrants to the United States